The Puerto Rican Volleyball Federation is a non-profit organization which serves as the national governing body of volleyball in Puerto Rico.
The national federation is recognized by the Fédération Internationale de Volleyball (FIVB) and the Puerto Rican Olympic Committee

Presidents

Tournaments
 Liga de Voleibol Superior Femenino (LVSF)
 Liga de Voleibol Superior Masculino (LVSM)
 Circuito de Voleibol Playero Profesional (CVP PRO)

External links
 Official website

References

Volleyball in Puerto Rico
Sports governing bodies in Puerto Rico
Puerto Rico